Douglas W. Carlson (November 1, 1939 – April 22, 2013) was an American veterinarian, beef farmer, and politician.

Born in Sandstone, Minnesota, Carlson served in the United States Air Force. He received his bachelor's degree and veterinary science degrees from University of Minnesota. He served in the Minnesota House of Representatives 1971–1975, 1977-1991 as a Republican. Later, Carlson served as Pine County, Minnesota commissioner. He died in Pine City, Minnesota.

Notes

1939 births
2013 deaths
People from Pine County, Minnesota
Military personnel from Minnesota
University of Minnesota College of Veterinary Medicine alumni
County commissioners in Minnesota
Republican Party members of the Minnesota House of Representatives
Farmers from Minnesota
American veterinarians
Male veterinarians
United States Air Force airmen
Beef